Roberto Schmits (born 4 February 1969) is a Brazilian sports shooter. He competed in the men's trap event at the 2016 Summer Olympics.

References

External links
 

1969 births
Living people
Brazilian male sport shooters
Olympic shooters of Brazil
Shooters at the 2016 Summer Olympics
Place of birth missing (living people)
Pan American Games medalists in shooting
Pan American Games bronze medalists for Brazil
South American Games silver medalists for Brazil
South American Games bronze medalists for Brazil
South American Games medalists in shooting
Shooters at the 2011 Pan American Games
Competitors at the 2014 South American Games
Shooters at the 2019 Pan American Games
Medalists at the 2011 Pan American Games
Medalists at the 2019 Pan American Games
20th-century Brazilian people
21st-century Brazilian people